Sarah Hall Judson (November 4, 1803 – September 1, 1845) was an American missionary and writer.

Biography
Sarah Hall was born in Alstead, New Hampshire. She spent twenty years of her life in Burma (now known as Myanmar) doing missionary work.  She and her husband George Boardman sailed to Burma in 1824, just one week after their wedding. They had a son also named George Dana Boardman, often referred to as "George Boardman the Younger". She was widowed in 1831.

Although during this era a widowed missionary wife would be expected to return to her homeland, Boardman continued to proselytize Karen in the jungles and supervised mission schools. In 1834, she married Adoniram Judson. In 1844, she gave birth to Edward Judson, who later pastored a church in New York City named after his father. Her illness forced the family to return to the United States in 1844, but she died en route at Saint Helena.  While in the U.S., Judson asked Emily Chubbuck to write Boardman's biography, and he subsequently married Chubbuck.

Boardman's Burmese translation of The Pilgrim's Progress is still in use today. She also translated the New Testament into Peguan.

References
 
 

1803 births
1845 deaths
People from Alstead, New Hampshire
Baptist missionaries in Myanmar
Baptist missionaries from the United States
Missionary educators
Female Christian missionaries
American expatriates in Myanmar
19th-century Baptists